Achanak may refer to:

 Achanak (1973 film)
 Achanak (1998 film)
 Achanak (band), a British bhangra band
 Achanak 37 Saal Baad, supernatural/thriller Hindi TV series